Adam Patel may refer to:
 Adam Patel, Baron Patel of Blackburn (1940 - 2019), British businessman
Adam Patel (magician), British illusionist